Parmjit Singh Gill (born 20 December 1966) is a British Liberal Democrat politician. As Member of Parliament for Leicester South from July 2004 to May 2005, he was the first ethnic-minority Liberal Democrat MP.

He was first elected as Liberal Democrat councillor for Leicester City Council's Stoneygate Ward, before being elected to the House of Commons at the Leicester South by-election on 15 July 2004. He contested the seat again at the 2005 general election, but this time came second to the Labour Party candidate, Sir Peter Soulsby. He continued to serve as on Stoneygate Ward until he was defeated in May 2011.

He was initially selected to run as the Liberal Democrat candidate for the 2011 Leicester South by-election after Soulsby stood down to run for mayor for Leicester. However, he stood down after a short time, citing family pressures and was replaced by Zuffar Haq.

He works as a local authority information management and security consultant for Charnwood Borough Council. Prior to that he worked as a data protection administrator for Leicester City Council.

He is married to Juliet Gill, and the couple have a son and daughter.

See also
 List of United Kingdom MPs with the shortest service

References

External links
Parmjit Singh Gill profile at the site of Liberal Democrats
Leicester Liberal Democrats constituency party
Guardian Politics Ask Aristotle - Parmjit Singh Gill
TheyWorkForYou.com - Parmjit Gill
The Public Whip - Parmjit Gill voting record
BBC News - Parmjit Singh Gill profile 10 February 2005

1966 births
Living people
British politicians of Indian descent
Liberal Democrats (UK) MPs for English constituencies
UK MPs 2001–2005
Politicians from Leicester
Councillors in Leicestershire
People from Stoneygate
21st-century English politicians
Liberal Democrats (UK) councillors
British people of Punjabi descent